Cesare Natali (born 5 April 1979) is an Italian former professional footballer who played as a centre-back.

Club career

Atalanta
Natali started his career at Atalanta. He scored the opening goal in the relegation playoffs second legs in June 2003, but Atalanta eventually lost 2–1 and relegated to Serie B. On 30 August 2003, Natali and Fausto Rossini were sold to Bologna in co-ownership deal. In June 2004, Natali and Rossini were re-signed by Atalanta. He was the regular of the team, partnered again with Gianpaolo Bellini and Luigi Sala.

Atalanta relegated again in June 2005.

Udinese
On 29 June 2005, he was signed by Udinese in a five-year contract, to rejoin teammate Piermario Morosini (50% for undisclosed fee), Massimo Gotti (undisclosed fee), Marco Motta (50% for €2.05 million), Fausto Rossini (50% for €450,000). However, Atalanta also signed Thomas Manfredini and Antonino D'Agostino from Udinese for a total of €2 million.

He was the regular of the team but suffered from fractured left ankle in September.

He made 32 starts during the 2006–07 season.

Torino
Since the signing of Aleksandar Luković, In July 2007, he was sold to Torino, signed a 4-year contract. He was the regular until injured in March 2008.

Fiorentina
On 4 July 2009, he was signed by ACF Fiorentina from relegated Torino, for €2.8 million, concurrently Torino signed Simone Loria as replacement. He signed a three-year contract.

On 20 October 2009, he played his first game for Fiorentina, at UEFA Champions League 2009–10 versus Debreceni VSC, replacing Dario Dainelli at half time. After the departure of Dainelli to Genoa in January, and the fitness problems of Alessandro Gamberini, Per Krøldrup and new signing Felipe, along with tactical rotation, he earned more chances to play, including the Champions league match against FC Bayern Munich.

Natali scored his first goal for Fiorentina on 29 January 2012, netting the second in a 2–1 victory over derby rivals Siena.

He scored his second soon after on 25 March against Genoa in the Stadio Luigi Ferraris. His header put Fiorentina 2–1 in front, however the match ended in a 2–2 draw.

Bologna
On 26 July 2012, Natali returned to Bologna for a second spell on a two-year contract.

Sassuolo
On 3 March 2015, he was signed by Sassuolo as a free agent.

International career
Along with his Atalanta teammate Gianpaolo Bellini, Natali was called up to the Italy under-21 squad for the 2002 UEFA European Under-21 Football Championship. They partnered together in all three group matches (including one substitute appearance) at the tournament as Italy reached the semi-finals.

In March 2004, he received his only international call-up to the senior Italian national team, to replace injured Marcello Castellini.

Career statistics

Club

References

External links
 Profile at ACF Fiorentina official site
 FIGC 

1979 births
Living people
Italian footballers
Italy under-21 international footballers
Serie A players
Serie B players
Serie C players
Atalanta B.C. players
Calcio Lecco 1912 players
A.C. Monza players
Bologna F.C. 1909 players
Udinese Calcio players
Torino F.C. players
ACF Fiorentina players
U.S. Sassuolo Calcio players
Association football central defenders
Footballers from Bergamo